Tracey Holloway is Gaylord Nelson Distinguished Professor at the Nelson Institute for Environmental Studies at the University of Wisconsin-Madison and Department of Atmospheric and Ocean Sciences. Her research focuses on the links between regional air quality, energy, and climate through the use of computer models and date from satellites.

Holloway earned a bachelor's degree in Applied Math from Brown University and PhD in Atmospheric and Oceanic Sciences from Princeton University in 2001. She was a postdoctoral scholar at the Earth Institute at Columbia University.
She currently also serves as the Team Leader for the NASA Health and Air Quality Applied Science Team (HAQAST) and lead efforts to promote the Energy Analysis and Policy (EAP) graduate certificate program in the Nelson Institute
Holloway was one of five women who founded Earth Science Women's Network in 2002, which as of 2017 had around 3,000 members.

Holloway served as Leopold Fellow in 2011, a AAAS,  received the first MIT Clean Energy Education and Empowerment Award in Education and Mentoring in 2018, and was a Leshner Leadership Fellow in 2016–2017.

In May 2017, she co-authored a study in Environmental Science & Technology that associated increased air conditioning use with increased levels of nitrogen oxides, sulfur dioxide, and carbon dioxide in the air.

References

External links
 (University of Wisconsin Madison College of Engineering)
Biography (NASA Health and Air Quality Applied Sciences Team)

Living people
University of Wisconsin–Madison faculty
Brown University alumni
Princeton University alumni
Columbia University alumni
American women scientists
Year of birth missing (living people)
American women academics
21st-century American women